Nadine G. Barlow (1958-2020) was an American planetary scientist. She was a professor in the Department of Physics and Astronomy at Northern Arizona University (NAU). She became Associate Chair of the NAU Department of Physics and Astronomy in Fall 2010. She was also the director of the Northern Arizona University/NASA Space Grant Program and an associate director of the Arizona Space Grant Consortium.

Career
During her career, Barlow taught at Palomar College, University of Houston–Clear Lake, University of Central Florida (UCF), and NAU, where she was on staff until the time of her death. She also conducted research at the NASA Johnson Space Center, the Lunar and Planetary Institute, and the United States Geological Survey (USGS) Astrogeology Science Center in Flagstaff. She served as the first director of the UCF Robinson Observatory in Orlando.

Barlow worked on a number of NASA lunar and planetary science projects, including:

Detailed Investigations of Martian Central Pit Craters
Investigating Indicators of Volatile-Rich Material in Arabia Terra, Mars
Geographic Information Systems (GIS) Database of Lunar Impact Craters
Morphologic Analysis of Impact Craters on Ganymede
GIS Database and Tools for Martian Impact Craters
Investigations of Martian Impact Crater Morphologies and Morphometries

She was considered to be one of the top Mars scholars in the world.

Barlow died on August 17, 2020, from ovarian cancer.

Awards and honors
Barlow received the University of Central Florida Excellence in Undergraduate Teaching Award in 2002 and the Palomar Community College Alumna of the Year Award for 2002–2003. In 1999 she was awarded the asteroid name 15466 Barlow by the International Astronomical Union (IAU) in her honor.

Selected works
Mars: An Introduction to its Interior, Surface, and Atmosphere  (2008)
Space Sciences  (co-editor, 2002)
Encyclopedia of Earth Sciences  (co-editor, 1996)

References

External links
 Nadine Barlow’s Northern Arizona University webpage
 NASA Solar System Exploration Profile: Nadine Barlow
 Women in Planetary Science: Meet Nadine Barlow

Living people
American women astronomers
Northern Arizona University faculty
University of Central Florida faculty
Planetary scientists
Women planetary scientists
University of Arizona alumni
1958 births